Härmä may refer to:

Hämeenlinnan Härmä, Finnish football club
Härmä (film), 2012 Finnish film
Härmä, Estonia, village in Meremäe Parish, Võru County, Estonia

See also
Härma (disambiguation)